Marginella fishhoenkensis is a species of sea snail, a marine gastropod mollusk in the family Marginellidae, the margin snails.

Description

Distribution

References

 Massier. 2004. Descriptions of new Marginellidae species from South Africa (Gastropoda: Marginellidae). Schriften zur Malakozoologie aus dem Haus der Natur-Cismar, 21 : 21–28
 Bouchet, P.; Fontaine, B. (2009). List of new marine species described between 2002-2006. Census of Marine Life

External links

Marginellidae
Gastropods described in 2004